Esbu Mahalleh (also Romanized as Esbū Maḩalleh; also known as Espū Maḩalleh) is a village in Roshanabad Rural District, in the Central District of Gorgan County, Golestan Province, Iran. At the 2006 census, its population was 1,651, in 459 families.

References 

Populated places in Gorgan County